William Henry Pole-Carew (30 July 1811 – 20 January 1888) was a Cornish politician.

Biography
Pole-Carew was born in Eaton Place, Marylebone in 1811, the son of Reginald Pole-Carew and Hon. Caroline Anne Lyttelton, daughter of William Lyttelton, 1st Baron Lyttelton. His father was a paternal descendant of the Pole baronets, of Shute House. He was educated at Charterhouse School from 1824 to 1828, and then at Oriel College, Oxford, gaining a BA in 1833 and an MA in 1864.

He served as Conservative Member of Parliament for East Cornwall from 1845 until 1852, and unsuccessfully contested Liskeard in 1859. He served as High Sheriff of Cornwall in 1854–1855, and as Recorder of East Looe from 1857 to 1886.

Pole-Carew joined the Canterbury Association on 3 June 1848. He was friends with John Robert Godley, and the Godley family stayed with him at Antony House while awaiting departure of the Lady Nugent for Lyttelton.

He died on 20 January 1888 at the Villa Poralto, Cannes.

Family
Pole-Carew was married on 28 August 1838 to Frances Anne Buller, daughter of John Buller. She died at Antony House on 10 October 1902. They had issue of 3 daughters and 4 sons, the eldest son being Lieutenant-General Sir Reginald Pole-Carew. His grandson succeeded a distant relative as baronet, of Shute House.

References

External links 

 

1811 births
1888 deaths
Alumni of Oriel College, Oxford
Conservative Party (UK) MPs for English constituencies
Members of the Parliament of the United Kingdom for constituencies in Cornwall
People educated at Charterhouse School
UK MPs 1841–1847
UK MPs 1847–1852
High Sheriffs of Cornwall
Members of the Canterbury Association